Aimar Oroz Huarte (born 27 November 2001) is a Spanish footballer who plays for CA Osasuna as a midfielder.

Club career
On 30 May 2018, after finishing his formation, he signed a two-year contract with the club, with an option for a further two.

Aged 16, Oroz made his senior debut with the reserves on 1 September 2018, starting in a 2–0 Tercera División home win against CD Subiza. He made his professional debut the following 31 May, coming on as a late substitute for Rubén García in a 3–2 away success over Córdoba CF in the Segunda División championship.

On 14 May 2020, after already becoming a regular starter for the B's, Oroz renewed his contract with the Rojillos until 2023. He made his La Liga debut on 19 July, replacing Adrián López in a 2–2 home draw against RCD Mallorca.

On 20 June 2022, after scoring 11 goals for the B's and helping in their promotion to Primera División RFEF, Oroz renewed his contract until 2026. On 31 August, after being a starter in the club's first three matches of the campaign, he was definitely promoted to the main squad.

Career statistics

Club

Honours
Osasuna
Segunda División: 2018–19

References

External links

2001 births
Living people
People from Cuenca de Pamplona
Footballers from Navarre
Spanish footballers
Association football midfielders
La Liga players
Segunda División players
Segunda División B players
Segunda Federación players
Tercera División players
CA Osasuna B players
CA Osasuna players
Spain under-21 international footballers